Pseudoplantago is a genus of flowering plants belonging to the family Amaranthaceae.

Its native range is Venezuela, Southern Brazil to Northeastern Argentina.

Species:

Pseudoplantago bisteriliflora 
Pseudoplantago friesii

References

Amaranthaceae
Amaranthaceae genera